Oak Lawn is a historic home located at Ridgely, Caroline County, Maryland, United States. It is a large rectangular -story brick structure with an arched brick colonnade connecting the two-story brick kitchen wing. The main house was erected in 1783 and the kitchen and arcade added before 1798. In the mid 19th century, it was owned by Greenbury Ridgely, the founder of the town of Ridgely.

Oak Lawn was listed on the National Register of Historic Places in 1975.

References

External links

, including undated photo, at Maryland Historical Trust

Houses in Caroline County, Maryland
Houses on the National Register of Historic Places in Maryland
Federal architecture in Maryland
Houses completed in 1783
National Register of Historic Places in Caroline County, Maryland